Attila Elek (born 6 December 1982 in Budapest) is a Hungarian ice dancer. With former partner Nóra Hoffmann, he is a two-time  (2003–2004) World Junior silver medalist, the 2003 JGP Final champion, and a five-time (2003–2007) Hungarian national champion. They placed 17th at the 2006 Winter Olympics in Torino.

Career 
Elek was paired with Nóra Hoffmann by coaches when he was nine years old. They twice won the silver medal at Junior Worlds, in 2003 and 2004. Hoffmann / Elek were silver medalists at the 2002–2003 Junior Grand Prix Final and won the title in 2003–2004. On the senior Grand Prix series, their best placement was 5th at 2006 Cup of Russia. Their best finish at senior Worlds was 15th in 2005. They competed at the 2006 Olympics, finishing 17th. During the warm-up at 2006 Worlds, another couple was performing a lift nearby and the woman's skates accidentally cut Hoffmann's back and elbow. Despite the pain, Hoffmann skated with Elek a few minutes later and they finished 18th.

At the 2007 European Championships, they were 7th after the original dance but they were forced to withdraw – Elek broke his leg during the morning practice before the free dance. They split up at the end of the season.

Personal life 
Elek's younger brother is György Elek, who also competed in ice dancing.

Programs 
(with Hoffmann)

Results 

(with Hoffmann)

References

External links

 
 Nora Hoffmann / Attila Elek official site
 Care to Ice Dance - Hoffmann / Elek

Navigation

1982 births
Living people
Hungarian male ice dancers
Olympic figure skaters of Hungary
Figure skaters at the 2006 Winter Olympics
Figure skaters from Budapest
World Junior Figure Skating Championships medalists